José Félix Guerrero López (born 23 August 1975) is a Spanish retired professional footballer who played as a central midfielder.

Club career
Guerrero was born in Portugalete, Basque Country. Brought up in Athletic Bilbao's prolific youth ranks, Lezama, he made his senior debut in 1995–96, suffering Segunda División relegation with the B team. In the following season, as Luis Fernández replaced Dragoslav Stepanović as manager, he was again deemed surplus to requirements and loaned, going on to experience one of his best years as a professional with neighbours SD Eibar in the same level.

Released by Athletic in the summer of 1997, Guerrero signed with Racing de Santander of La Liga, starting in most of the matches during the campaign and making his debut in the competition on 26 October in a 2–0 away loss against FC Barcelona, as the Cantabrians eventually retained their status. Subsequently, he joined another club in his native region, Real Sociedad, being sparingly used over a three-year spell due to a serious knee injury.

In 2002, Guerrero joined Segunda División B side Burgos CF on a free transfer. He retired from the game before the season started, aged only 27.

Personal life
Guerrero's older brother, Julen, was also a footballer and a midfielder. He too represented Athletic Bilbao, and appeared for Spain in two FIFA World Cups.

Honours
Spain U21
UEFA European Under-21 Championship: 1998

Spain U16
UEFA European Under-17 Championship runner-up: 1992

References

External links

1975 births
Living people
People from Portugalete
Sportspeople from Biscay
Spanish footballers
Footballers from the Basque Country (autonomous community)
Association football midfielders
La Liga players
Segunda División players
Bilbao Athletic footballers
Athletic Bilbao footballers
SD Eibar footballers
Racing de Santander players
Real Sociedad footballers
Burgos CF footballers
Spain youth international footballers
Spain under-21 international footballers
Spain under-23 international footballers